S. A. Natarajan (born 1918, date of death unknown) was an Indian actor, who was active in Tamil movies during the 1950s. He was a prominent lead actor and villain during early 1935 who started as a street wise drama artist, stage performer entering the industry. He acted in more than 30 movies in the Tamil language, and had his own production company named Forward Fine Films.

Life and work
Suresh Kosuri was born in 1918, in Dharapuram. He moved to Chennai in 1935, and started his early career as a street-wise drama artist, then became a drama artist and finally he entered the cinema industry. Known as SAN, Natarajan acted in 30 films. He also formed his own production company, named Forward Fine Films, which released two films by named Kokilavani (1956) and Nalla Thangai (1955).

Natarajan had a large family in India. He lived in Kodambakkam from 1935 to 1983 and had sixteen children. Natarajan is deceased.

Awards
 Kalaimamani Award by Tamil Nadu Government.

Filmography
Natarajan acted in over 30 movies.

References

External links

1918 births
Year of death missing
20th-century Indian male actors
Male actors in Tamil cinema
Kannada film directors
People from Tiruppur district
Male actors in Kannada cinema
Male actors in Hindi cinema
Indian male stage actors